A statue of Christopher Columbus was installed in Columbia, South Carolina, United States as part of the Columbus Quincentenary. The memorial was removed and placed into storage in June 2020.

See also

 List of monuments and memorials removed during the George Floyd protests
 List of monuments and memorials to Christopher Columbus

References

Buildings and structures in Columbia, South Carolina
Monuments and memorials in South Carolina
Monuments and memorials removed during the George Floyd protests
Relocated buildings and structures in South Carolina
Sculptures of men in South Carolina
Columbia, South Carolina
Statues removed in 2020